Tatyana Yevgenievna Lavrova (real name  Andrikanis, June 7, 1938 —  May 16, 2007) was a Soviet and Russian actress of theater and cinema. People's Artist of the RSFSR.

Biography 
The daughter of cinematographers Yevgeni Andrikanis (1909 — 1993)  and Galina Pyshkova. Savva Morozov's cousin's great-grandson, an entrepreneur and philanthropist. Nickname Lavrova took for the sake of euphony at random.

Graduated from Moscow Art Theater School. In 1959-1961 and from 1978 —  actress of the Moscow Art Theater. In the years 1961-1978 —  Sovremennik Theatre.

All-Union glory of Lavrova brought the main role in the film by Mikhail Romm Nine Days in One Year.

Lived a civil marriage with Yevgeni Urbansky.   The second husband is an actor Oleg Dal, with whom they lived for six months. The third actress's husband was a famous Soviet football player, Vladimir Mikhaylov. The son of the third marriage is Vladimir (1969).

In 1998 she was awarded the Order of Honour.

Death 
She died on May 16, 2007, after a long illness. She was buried in the Troyekurovskoye Cemetery in Moscow.

Selected filmography
1947: Marite as classmate of the main character (episode)
1961: Nine Days in One Year as Lyolya
1965: Time, Forward! as Klava
1967: The Mysterious Wall as Lena
1971: All the King's Men as Sadie Burke
1975: The Flight of Mr. McKinley as Mrs. Perkins
1982: The Voice as Akhtyrskaya
1998: Chekhov and Co as Olga Dmitrievna

References

External links
 
 
 Т. Е. Лаврова на сайте МХТ им. Чехова

1938 births
2007 deaths
Actresses from Moscow
Soviet film actresses
Soviet stage actresses
Russian film actresses
Russian stage actresses
People's Artists of the RSFSR
Honored Artists of the RSFSR
Recipients of the Order of Honour (Russia)
Recipients of the Nika Award
Moscow Art Theatre School alumni
Burials in Troyekurovskoye Cemetery
20th-century Russian women